Saúl Phillips Fernández (born October 3, 1984) is a Costa Rican football player who currently plays for Bayamón in the National Premier Soccer League.

Club career
Phillips came through the youth system at Alajuelense and has played for Saprissa from 2001. With Saprissa he won two national championships as well as a UNCAF Cup title and a CONCACAF Champions Cup title. He also played the 2005 FIFA Club World Championship Toyota Cup, where Saprissa finished third behind São Paulo and Liverpool

He moved to Brujas in summer 2007 and was captain of Santos de Guápiles before returning to Saprissa in December 2010.

In December 2012, Phillips left Guatemalan giants Municipal, joining Universidad and in summer 2014 he moved to Puerto Rico to play for Bayamón.

International career
He was on the U17 Costa Rica national team that played in the 2001 FIFA U-17 World Championship held in Trinidad and Tobago. He never made it to the senior national team.

References

1984 births
Living people
Association football midfielders
Costa Rican footballers
Deportivo Saprissa players
Brujas FC players
Santos de Guápiles footballers
C.S.D. Municipal players
Universidad de San Carlos players
Bayamón FC players
Costa Rican expatriate footballers
Expatriate footballers in Guatemala
Expatriate footballers in Puerto Rico